is a Japanese football club based in the city of Oita, capital of Oita Prefecture. They currently play in the Japan Football League, Japanese fourth tier of league football. They play at the league ever since being promoted to it on 2012, as the club was the 2011 Kyushu Soccer League champions. The club is playing their 12th consecutive season at the JFL on 2023.

History 
The club was formed in 2003 as Hoyo FC. In 2005 they changed their name to Hoyo Atletico Elan, the name in which they competed for many years in the Kyushu Football League. The club is backed by the Hoyo Group, a digital camera and auto parts manufacturer based in nearby Kunisaki. In 2010 they changed their name to Hoyo Atletico Elan Oita. In 2011, they changed their name to Hoyo AC Elan Oita, won the Kyushu Soccer League and earned third place in the Regional League promotion series, which gave them qualification to compete in the JFL from 2012. Ahead of a league jump, they changed their name to Hoyo Oita on 2012.

In 2020, Verspah won their first Japan Football League title. The title campaign was fairly unusual, as issues regarding COVID-19 prevented the league to be held normally. The clubs were only able to play the first half of the planned matches, 15 out of 30. The league decided to abandon the season and give the title to the 1st-placed team at that time, which was Verspah Oita. As the club did not have a J3 license at the time, the club was unable to receive promotion to professional league football, despite being a J.League 100 Year Plan club status holders.

In 2021, with the league operating normally with all matches being played, Verspah ended the league season in the 3rd place, but, the same issue was brought up. The club still was not a J3 license holder, and then, could not get promoted to the J3. Their J3 license was issued and granted only in the following 2022 season, which the club finished in 8th place, eight points off the promotion zone.

Team name 
The current team's name, "Verspah", was coined by combining the Portuguese word "vermelho", which means "red", and the English word "spa", which represents hot springs (after famously-known Beppu Onsen), and the initial letter "H" of the former team name Hoyo Oita.

Home Towns
The main home towns are Beppu and Yufu. On 28 June 2022, at a J.League Board of Directors meeting, they approved the addition of the Ōita city.

Historical Logos

League & cup record 

Key

Honours 
Oita Prefecture League 3rd Division
Winners (1): 2005
Oita Prefecture League 2nd Division
Winners (1): 2006
Oita Prefecture League 2nd Division
Winners (1): 2009
Kyushu League
Winners (2): 2010, 2011
Japan Football League
Winners (1): 2020

Current squad 
As of 12 March 2023.

Club Staff

Managerial history

References

External links 
Official website

 
Football clubs in Japan
Association football clubs established in 2003
Sports teams in Ōita Prefecture
Ōita (city)
Japan Football League clubs
Works association football clubs in Japan
2003 establishments in Japan